Mood Swing is the debut album by American new wave group The Nails. Recorded and released in 1984, it included the novelty single "88 Lines About 44 Women," which entered the Billboard Dance Club Songs chart, and placed at number 208 on the US Pop Albums Sales chart. It is retrospectively held in high regard by critics.

Background and release
In 1984, The Nails signed with RCA for their major-label debut album. The album was recorded the same year at three New York studios: the Boogie Hotel, Electric Lady, and Skyline Studios. The album followed the group's independently-released EP, Hotel for Women, released in early 1981 and featuring three versions of the group's breakout single, "88 Lines About 44 Women," which was again included on Mood Swing in a slightly altered form. The album was produced by Gregg Winter. The group was shown in a December 1984 issue of Billboard, "putting the finishing touches" on the album.

The album was originally released in late 1984, by RCA Records. In 2007, a re-mastered edition of the album was released by CD Baby, and in 2012, another re-release was issued by CityBeat. These versions included two additional tracks: extended remixes of "88 Lines About 44 Women" and "Let It All Hang Out."

Reception

Critical
In a retrospective review for AllMusic, critic Richard Foss deemed Mood Swing an "album pick" of the group's discography. He awarded it 4 and a half stars out of 5 and went on to praise it as "a remarkably consistent and confident debut," comparing the music to that of The Damned, Jim Carroll, and Stan Ridgway and praising the lyrics' irony.

Commercial
Upon its release, the album attained modest commercial success. In March 1985, it appeared on Billboard Magazine's list of "Bubbling Under" albums, at number 208. The album failed to enter the Billboard Hot 200 album sales chart; however, they later managed to with their next record, Dangerous Dreams, in 1986. "88 Lines of 44 Women," originally featured on Hotel for Women but re-recorded for Mood Swing, became a hit on MTV and peaked at number 46 on the Billboard Dance Club Songs chart in April 1985.

Track listing
Side A

Side B

Credits
Adapted from AllMusic.

Band members
Marc Campbell — vocals
Steve O'Rourke — guitar
George Kaufman - bass
Douglas Guthrie — saxophone
David Kaufman — keyboards

Other musicians
Jimmy Bralower — electronic drums
Boris Kinberg — percussion
Arooj Lazewal — tabla, tambourine
Dennis McDermott — drums
Khari Paige — background vocals
Badal Roy — tabla
Rocky Savino, Jr. — harmonica
Ellen Warshaw — background vocals
Gregg Winter — drum programming and synthesizer on "88 Lines About 44 Women", background vocals

Production
Bruce Harris — executive producer
Vic Anesini — digital mastering
Michael Frondelli — engineer
Chris Isca — assistant engineer
Roger Moutenot — assistant engineer
Jack Skinner — mastering
Gregg Winter — producer

References

1984 debut albums
New wave albums by American artists